Pocho Department is a  department of Córdoba Province in Argentina.

The provincial subdivision has a population of about 5,132 inhabitants in an area of 3,207 km2, and its capital city is Salsacate, which is located around 850 km from Capital Federal.

Settlements
Chancaní
Las Palmas
Los Talares
Salsacate
San Gerónimo
Tala Cañada
Villa de Pocho

Departments of Córdoba Province, Argentina